Aitana Bonmatí Conca (born 18 January 1998) is a Spanish professional footballer who plays as a midfielder for Liga F club Barcelona and Spain women's national team.

Bonmatí has been with Barcelona since 2012, developing through La Masia for six years. She was promoted to Barcelona's first team ahead of the 2016–17 season, and made off-the-bench appearances for the club until her breakout year in the 2018-19 season. In 2019, she started the first UEFA Women's Champions League final of Barcelona's history, and later in the year was voted Catalan Player of the Year for the first time.

Throughout the 2020–21 season, Bonmatí was essential to Barcelona's continental treble-winning campaign. She had one of the most noteworthy performances of her career in the 2021 UEFA Women's Champions League final, scoring Barcelona's third goal and being named MVP of the Final.

Bonmatí has found success with Spain's U-17, U-19 and U-20 youth categories. She has won two UEFA Youth Championships – one each with Spain's U-17s and U-19s – and has been runner-up in two FIFA Youth Women's World Cups – one each with Spain's U-17s and U-20s. She has been a senior team Spain women's national team player since 2017, and featured in Spain's squad at the 2019 FIFA Women's World Cup.

Early life
Bonmatí was born in Sant Pere de Ribes, Catalonia. When she was born in 1998, her parents wanted to abandon Spanish naming customs that default to the paternal surname being listed first. For the first two years of her life, she was known as Aitana Bonmatí Guidonet, with her two surnames both being from her mother. In 2000, the law in Spain changed that allowed her maternal surname, Bonmatí, to be her first surname, and her paternal surname, Conca, to be her second surname.

In her childhood, she played basketball, but at age seven she took up football and played with boys in mixed teams. She often recalls getting picked on by boys for her short stature. The first clubs she played football with were CD Ribes and CF Cubelles, both male/mixed gender teams, which she believes helped improve her strength and intensity. At the age of 13, she joined Barcelona to play in their youth teams, where she would take two-hour long public transport rides with her father to get to practice.

Club career

FC Barcelona youth teams (2012–2016)
Bonmatí started her Barcelona career by joining Juvenil-Cadet, the second-highest developmental team for girls at FC Barcelona. In 2013 with Juvenil-Cadet, Bonmatí won the team's respective league and the Copa Catalunya competitions. The next season, she again won the league with Juvenil-Cadet, going undefeated. In the final of the Copa Catalunya, the match went to penalties where she converted her penalty but ended up losing 4–2 to Sant Gabriel after the shootout.

Bonmatí moved up to become a Barcelona B player after two years at the club. During her time with the B team, she sparingly made appearances for the first team in preseason. Throughout the 2015–16 season, Bonmatí played an important part in winning the championship of Segunda Division, Group III for the first time in the club's history, by scoring 14 goals for Barcelona. At the end of the season she was promoted to the Barcelona's first team by the manager Xavi Llorens.

FC Barcelona (2016–present)

2016–17 season 
Bonmatí made her first team competitive debut during the quarterfinals of the 2016 Copa de la Reina against Real Sociedad, providing an assist to Bárbara Latorre. She continued to feature in the tournament as a substitute, coming on late in the match during a 3–0 semifinal win against Levante. Bonmatí featured in the final against Atletico Madrid, subbing on for Gemma Gili in a match that finished a 2–3 loss for Barcelona.

The following month, at the start of the new season, she was a part of Barcelona's squad at the Copa Catalunya, where she played and scored in both matches of the tournament. The final against Espanyol ended a 6–0 win for Barca, where Bonmatí earned her first senior title with the club. She made her UEFA Women's Champions League debut in the Round of 32 against FK Minsk. Bonmatí was used sparingly her first season with the senior team, making thirteen league appearances with three starts and scoring two goals – a brace against Oiartzun. She scored Barcelona's fourth goal in the final of the 2017 Copa de la Reina, a 4–1 win over Atlético Madrid.

2017–18 season 
In the 2017–18 season, Bonmatí continued to sparingly make appearances, mostly in the league. Her only goal of the season was also her first ever Champions League goal in a Round of 16 match against Lithuanian club Gintra Universitetas. She came on for Toni Duggan in the 2018 Copa de la Reina final that went into extra-time and ended with a Barcelona win, her second major title with the club.

2018–19 season 
The 2018–19 season was a breakout season for Bonmatí as she consistently made first team appearances in Spain. She also made regular Champions League appearances, scoring once against Glasgow City in the Round of 16. Barcelona made it to their first ever Champions League final where she started the match, and despite a 4–1 loss to Lyon, she had a moment that went viral when she outran Shanice van de Sanden down the right-wing to prevent a counter-attack. Bonmatí ended her season with twelve league goals and played all but 5 matches in all competitions.

2019–20 season 
Despite an approach from Bayern Munich, Bonmatí signed a new contract with Barcelona in the summer of 2019 that would keep her at the club until 2022.
For her performances with Barcelona and Spain in the previous season, she won Catalan women's player of the year with 68% of the vote.

In 2020, she made her 100th appearance for Barcelona, coming on as a substitute against Tacón. Following a brief period of injury, she was substituted on in both matches of the Supercopa de España, including the final that Barcelona won 10–1 over Real Sociedad. Months later, following a decision from the RFEF to suspend the 2019-20 league season due to the COVID-19 pandemic, Barcelona were given the title, making it Aitana's first league title with the club as a senior player.

2020–21 season 
In the middle of the 2020–21 season, Bonmatí played the final of the 2019–20 Copa de la Reina against Logroño, postponed a year later than normal due to COVID-19 concerns. She scored Barcelona's second goal of the final from a shot just inside the area, and earned the title of Copa de la Reina Final MVP for her performance.

In the semifinals of that season's Champions League, Bonmatí provided an assist to Jenni Hermoso that brought Barcelona to a 1–1 draw in the first leg against Paris Saint-Germain. Barcelona won the second leg against PSG 2–1, where she started and was subbed out in the 79th minute for Asisat Oshoala. On 16 May 2021, she started her second Champions League final, this time against Chelsea. She scored off a ball from Alexia Putellas by dribbling past Jess Carter, giving Barcelona a 3–0 lead in the 21st minute. Barcelona finished the match as champions with a resounding 4–0 win, and Bonmatí's performance in the match earned her Champions League Final MVP. Her goal was also voted 5th-best of the tournament, and she was included in the UWCL Squad of the Season for the first time. Later in the year, Bonmatí was listed as a nominee to the UEFA Women's Champions League Midfielder of the Season award.

International career

Youth
Bonmatí has played at every junior level of the Spain women's national football team, including the U-17, U-19 and U-20 national teams.

At 15 years old, Bonmatí was called up as part of Spain's squad for the 2014 UEFA Women's U-17 Euro. She scored her first U-17 national team goals with a brace against Germany in a 4–0 group stage win, helping Spain finish first in Group B. From there, Spain advanced past the semifinals after a 2–1 win against England. Bonmatí reached the final where she started the match, but ultimately finished runner-up in the tournament as Spain lost to Germany on penalties. She registered 398 total minutes in the tournament.

Months later, she participated in the 2014 FIFA U-17 Women's World Cup where she mostly had a substitute role. In the semifinal, Bonmatí was a halftime substitute against Italy, where Spain advanced after defeating them 2–0. Bonmatí was substituted on in the 53rd minute of the final, where Spain fell 0–2 to Japan.

Additionally, she was a member of the Spain U-17 squad that won the 2015 UEFA Women's U-17 Euro. In the group stage, she registered her first and only goal of the tournament in a 4–0 win against Germany. Spain finished first in Group A where they then faced France in the semifinal. She started and played through extra time where the match ended up going to penalties. She converted her penalty to end the shootout 4–3 and advance to the final against Switzerland. With a 5–2 win in the final, Bonmatí earned her first international title and was subsequently named to the Team of the Tournament for her standout performances throughout the competition.

Bonmatí was part of the Spain U-19 team that won the 2017 UEFA Women's Under-19 Euro. As part of a suspension, she was forced to sit out of the first three group stage matches after receiving a straight red card in a qualifying match versus Belgium. She made her first tournament appearance as captain in the semi-finals against Netherlands. Spain advanced to the final against France with a 3–2 win. Bonmatí started and captained the team to a victory against France, snapping Spain's run of three consecutive finals defeats at the U-19 Euro. With their finish, she earned her second international title as Spain were one of the three UEFA teams to qualify for the 2018 FIFA U-20 Women's World Cup.

Bonmatí was again named team captain at the 2018 FIFA U-20 Women's World Cup. In Group C, Spain registered two wins against Japan and Paraguay. They finished first in the group by holding the United States to a draw, knocking them out of the tournament in the group stage for the first time. Bonmatí was named the "Dare To Shine" player of the match. In the quarterfinals, she scored twice against Nigeria, but the second goal was not given despite TV replays showing it crossing the goal-line. Spain won that match 2–1 and reached the semi-final of the tournament against France. Bonmatí started the match but was sent off with a second yellow card after a challenge on France's Selma Bacha- the only red card in the entire tournament. Up until her ejection, she had played every minute of the tournament. Spain ended up winning the match, but Bonmatí was suspended for the final where Spain fell 1–3 to Japan.

She also has experience with the U-18 and U-16 Catalonia national football teams.

Senior
In November 2017, coach Jorge Vilda gave Bonmatí her first senior national team call–up for two 2019 FIFA Women's World Cup qualifying matches. She made her debut for Spain's senior national team against Austria, subbing on for Amanda Sampedro in the 53rd minute.

Bonmatí's first senior international tournament experience came in February 2018 when she was called up to participate in the 2018 Cyprus Cup. She made limited appearances throughout the tournament, but with Spain's win in the first-place match against Italy, she earned her first title with Spain's senior team.

Her first national team goal came a year and a half after her debut in April 2019 during a friendly match against England.

In May 2019, Bonmatí was named to the Spain's 2019 FIFA Women's World Cup squad. She featured in two group stage matches – a win against South Africa and a loss against Germany. Spain finished second in Group A and reached the knockout rounds of a Women's World Cup for the first time in their history. They were defeated 1–2 in the Round of 16 by eventual tournament winners United States. Bonmatí finished the tournament with 58 minutes.

Later in that year, Bonmatí played in each of Spain's UEFA Women's Euro 2022 qualifying matches, ending the qualification phase with six goals.

Bonmatí was named in Spain's squad for the 2020 SheBelieves Cup that was held in March 2020. She played in two of the three matches as Spain finished second behind hosts United States.

On 25 November 2021, Bonmatí scored twice in a 12–0 win against Faroe Islands in a 2023 FIFA Women's World Cup qualifying match. Five days later, she scored two more against Scotland.

Style of play
FCF has described Bonmatí as "pure elegance" and has noted her versatility as a player, able to adapt to different positions, play centrally, as a midfielder or as a winger.

After winning her first Catalan Player of the Year award, Jordi Ventura, the coach who signed her to Barcelona's Cadet team, emphasized that she is "an intense player, very competitive and perfectly dominates with both legs." In the same article, former FCB Femeni coach Xavi Llorens describes Bonmatí as having "innate elegance in driving the ball" and being "very competitive...  versatile, can play in three, four or five positions and does not lower her level."

Ahead of the 2019 FIFA Women's World Cup, FIFA described her in her player profile as "technically gifted" with "superb vision with plenty of character" and "combative when required with an eye for goal."

Bonmatí sees her short stature as an advantage due to her low center of gravity that makes it hard for opponents to take her off the ball.

Personal life
Bonmatí's idols are Xavi and Andrés Iniesta. She has also stated that she models her game after former club and national team teammate Vicky Losada.

Bonmatí is currently studying Physical Activity and Sports Sciences at Ramon Llull University in preparation for the end of her footballing career.

Career statistics

Club

International
Scores and results list Spain's goal tally first.

Honours
Barcelona B
 Segunda División: 2015–16 (Group-III)

Barcelona
 Primera División: 2019–20, 2020–21, 2021–22
UEFA Women's Champions League: 2020–21; 
 Copa de la Reina: 2017, 2018, 2019–20, 2020–21, 2021–22
 Supercopa de España: 2019–20, 2021–22, 2022–23
 Copa Catalunya: 2016, 2017, 2018, 2019

Spain (youth)
 FIFA U-20 Women's World Cup:  runner-up- 2018
 FIFA U-17 Women's World Cup: runner-up- 2014
 UEFA Women's Under-17 Championship: 2015; runner-up- 2014
 UEFA Women's Under-19 Championship: 2017; runner-up- 2016

Spain
 Cyprus Cup: 2018

Individual
 UEFA Women's Championship Team of the Tournament: 2022
 UEFA Women's Under-17 Championship Team of the Tournament: 2015
 Copa de la Reina Final MVP: 2019–20
 Supercopa de España Femenina Final MVP: 2022–23
 Catalan Player of the Year: 2019
 UEFA Women's Champions League Final MVP: 2021
 UEFA Women's Champions League Squad of the Season: 2020–21
Premi Barça Jugadors (Barça Players Award): 2020–21
IFFHS Women's World Team: 2022

Notes

References

Social media
 
 Instagram

External links
 
 Aitana Bonmatí at FC Barcelona
 Aitana Bonmatí at BDFutbol
 
 
 
 Aitana Bonmatí at Txapeldunak.com 

1998 births
Living people
People from Garraf
Sportspeople from the Province of Barcelona
Sportswomen from Catalonia
Footballers from Catalonia
Spanish women's footballers
Women's association football midfielders
FC Barcelona Femení B players
FC Barcelona Femení players
Primera División (women) players
Spain women's youth international footballers
Spain women's international footballers
2019 FIFA Women's World Cup players
UEFA Women's Euro 2022 players